

Acts of the Northern Ireland Assembly

|-
| {{|Appropriation Act (Northern Ireland) 2000|ania|2|25-07-2000|maintained=y|archived=n|An Act to authorise the issue out of the Consolidated Fund of certain sums for the service of the year ending on 31st March 2001; to appropriate those sums for specified purposes and authorise other sums to be applied as appropriations in aid for those purposes; to authorise the Department of Finance and Personnel to borrow on the credit of the appropriated sums; and to repeal certain Appropriation Orders.}}
|-
| {{|Allowances to Members of the Assembly Act (Northern Ireland) 2000|ania|3|25-07-2000|maintained=y|archived=n|An Act to make provision for the payment of allowances to or in respect of persons who have been members of the Northern Ireland Assembly.}}
|-
| {{|Child Support, Pensions and Social Security Act (Northern Ireland) 2000|ania|4|20-11-2000|maintained=y|archived=n|An Act to amend the law relating to child support; to amend the law relating to occupational and personal pensions; to amend the law relating to social security benefits and social security administration; to amend Part III of the Family Law Reform (Northern Ireland) Order 1977 and Part V of the Matrimonial and Family Proceedings (Northern Ireland) Order 1989; and for connected purposes.}}
|-
| {{|Weights and Measures (Amendment) Act (Northern Ireland) 2000|ania|5|20-12-2000|maintained=y|archived=n|An Act to amend the Weights and Measures (Northern Ireland) Order 1981 to allow self-verification of weighing or measuring equipment, testing by official EEA testers and pre-test stamping.}}
}}

References

2000